Alfonso Angel Cueto (born August 2, 1946) is a Cuban-born former professional basketball player.

A 6'7" center, Cueto attended Coral Gables Senior High School in Coral Gables, Florida and the University of Tulsa after transferring from St. Gregory's University. He was selected by the Seattle SuperSonics in the tenth round of the 1969 NBA draft, but he never joined the team. Cueto did play two seasons in the American Basketball Association (ABA) as a member of the Miami Floridians and Memphis Pros. He averaged 5.3 points and 4.3 rebounds in his professional career.

References

1946 births
Living people
Basketball players from Havana
Centers (basketball)
Cuban emigrants to the United States
Cuban men's basketball players
Memphis Pros players
Miami Floridians players
Seattle SuperSonics draft picks
St. Gregory's University alumni
Tulsa Golden Hurricane men's basketball players